Anaís Vivas (born 25 August 1989) is a Venezuelan singer. She had remarkable success with her debut album Ser, positioning her songs "Muero por ti" and "Por el resto de mi vida" in the Record Report music chart in 2011, and obtaining international recognition with an HTV Heat Award for Best Female Artist.

Biography
Anaís Vivas was born in Caracas. During her childhood she studied music both in Caracas and Miami. In adolescence she studied at the Manuel Alberto López National Conservatory of Music in Caracas. In addition to preparing for singing, she ventured into dance (flamenco, tap, and jazz) and acting. Her debut in musical theater was with the role of Gretl von Trapp in The Sound of Music. At the age of 13 she made her debut as a soloist in the interpretation of the "Habanera" from the opera Carmen.

She completed her studies at the University of Miami's Frost School of Music, where she obtained a scholarship and earned a degree in Music Business and Entertainment Industries, with a mention in lyrical singing, specializing in musical theater. At the same time she was part of the Frost Chorale's line of sopranos, with whom she toured Florida and Spain.

Musical career

2011–2013: Debut album Ser
In September 2011 Vivas premiered "Muero por ti" on Venezuelan radio, her first promotional single, a pop ballad with melodies and nuances of lyrical singing. The single was positioned among the top 10 of the National Record Report, and with this she obtained a position among the singers with the most votes obtained during that year. The music video, directed by Diego Osorio, was released weeks later and managed to enter the rotation of several music video channels.

In November 2011, Vivas premiered her first album named Ser, featuring the production of Juan Carlos Pérez Soto. Her second promotional single, entitled "Un mundo sin nunca", was written by the Puerto Rican singer Luis Fonsi. At the end of that year, she collaborated on the aguinaldo "Niño lindo" with Venezuelan singer-songwriter .

That year she opened concerts in Caracas for singer Laura Pausini and the group Il Volo. In December 2012 she released the single "Diciembre otra vez" as part of a campaign for UNICEF, and in 2013 she released the video of her single "Ser", for which she had the participation of her fans, who shared their videos through her Facebook page.

She won in the Best Female Artist category at the Pepsi Venezuela Music Awards ceremony that year, and released the video for the song "Por el resto de mi vida".

2014–present
In 2014 Vivas again managed to win in the category Best Female Artist at the Pepsi Music Awards.

In 2015 she recorded the single "Corazón Oculto", the main theme of the Venezuelan film , directed by Abraham Pulido. Months later, she won the HTV Heat Award for Best Female Artist, sharing the category with the singers Shakira, Gloria Trevi, Adriana Lucia, and Farina. This award was the first international recognition achieved in her career.

As of 2017, Vivas is working on the production of her second album with renowned music producer Humberto Gatica.

Discography

Studio albums
 2011: Ser

Singles
 "Muero por ti"
 "Un mundo sin jamás"
 "Nada mejor que tú"
 "Ser"
 "Por el resto de mi vida"

Other songs
 "Niño lindo" (with )
 "Diciembre otra vez"
 "Corazón oculto" 
 "Duendecillos en la Cama" (with Víctor Muñoz)

References

External links
 

1989 births
Latin pop singers
Living people
Singers from Caracas
Sopranos
University of Miami Frost School of Music alumni
21st-century Venezuelan women singers